The 2020 season was the 108th season of competitive soccer in the United States. Many of the competitions were significantly altered, postponed, or cancelled in the wake of the ongoing COVID-19 pandemic.

National teams

Men's

Senior

.

Friendlies

Goalscorers
Goals are current as of December 9, 2020, after the match against .

U–23

CONCACAF Men's Olympic Qualifying Championship

The tournament was moved to March 2021.

U–20

CONCACAF U-20 Championship

The tournament was originally scheduled to be held in Honduras between 20 June and 5 July 2020. However, on 13 May 2020, CONCACAF announced the decision to postpone the tournament due to the COVID-19 pandemic, with the new dates of the tournament to be confirmed later.

Group E

Women's

Senior

.

Friendlies

CONCACAF Women's Olympic Qualifying Championship

The draw for the tournament was on 7 November 2019, 14:30 EST (UTC−5), at the Mediapro Studio in Miami, Florida, United States.

Group A

Knockout stage

SheBelieves Cup

Goalscorers
Goals are current as of November 27, 2020, after the match against .

U–20

CONCACAF Women's U-20 Championship

Group C

Knockout stage

Club competitions

Men's

League competitions

Major League Soccer

MLS is Back Tournament

Group A

Group B

Group C

Group D

Group E

Group F

Ranking of third-placed teams

Knockout stage

Final

Conference tables 

 Eastern Conference

 Western Conference

Overall 2020 table 
Note: the table below has no impact on playoff qualification and is used solely for determining host of the MLS Cup, certain CCL spots, the Supporters' Shield trophy, seeding in the 2021 Canadian Championship, and 2021 MLS draft. The conference tables are the sole determinant for teams qualifying for the playoffs.

MLS Playoffs

MLS Cup

USL Championship 
Renamed from United Soccer League (USL) after the 2018 season

Conference tables 
Eastern Conference

Western Conference

USL League One

National Independent Soccer Association

Conference tables 
Eastern Conference

Western Conference

Fall Championship 
Group A

Group B

Knock-Out Round

Final

Cup competitions

US Open Cup 

Due to the ongoing uncertainty surrounding the coronavirus pandemic across the world, U.S. Soccer's Open Cup Committee temporarily suspended the 2020 Lamar Hunt U.S. Open Cup, U.S. Soccer's National Championship.

On August 17 the Cup was canceled.

International competitions

CONCACAF competitions

2020 CONCACAF Champions League

teams in bold are still active in the competition

Round of 16

|}

Quarter-finals

||colspan="2" 

|}

Semi-finals

|}

Final

Leagues Cup

Major League Soccer announced the cancellation of the tournament on May 19, 2020, due to the ongoing COVID-19 pandemic.

teams in bold are still active in the competition.

Campeones Cup

Major League Soccer announced the cancellation of the tournament on May 19, 2020, due to the ongoing COVID-19 pandemic.

Coaching changes

Women's

League competitions

National Women's Soccer League

NWSL Challenge Cup

Knockout round

Final

National Women's Soccer League season

Season canceled.

NWSL Fall Series 
The NWSL announced the full schedule of the Fall Series on September 3, 2020. One day later, the NWSL announced that the winners of the Fall Series would receive the Verizon Community Shield and a grant of $25,000 to present to their chosen community partner; $15,000 and $10,000 would be presented to community partners of the second- and third-place teams, respectively.

United Women's Soccer

Coaching changes

Honors

Professional

Amateur

Notes

External links
US Soccer Schedule
US Soccer Results
CONCACAF
MLS
NWSL
USL
USL1
NISA

References

 
Seasons in American soccer
Soccer